Kenneth Scott Koplove (born August 2, 1993) is an American right-handed professional baseball pitcher who has played internationally with the Israel national baseball team and is currently a free agent.

In high school, as a senior Koplove was named the 2012 Gatorade Pennsylvania Player of the Year. As a junior at Duke University in 2015, he struck out 37 batters in 25.1 innings, while setting the school's single-season record with 11 saves.

He was selected in the 17th round of the 2015 Major League Baseball Draft by the Philadelphia Phillies. Koplove was on the roster of Team Israel at the 2017 World Baseball Classic.

Early life
Koplove was born in Philadelphia, Pennsylvania, and grew up in South Philadelphia. He is the son of Steve (an attorney) and Joni Koplove, and is Jewish. He is the younger brother of former major league pitcher Mike Koplove, who is 17 years older. He also has two older sisters; named Andrea and Erica.

High school
Koplove played high school baseball for William Penn Charter School. He was named 2009 Southeastern Pennsylvania Rookie of the Year by the Philadelphia Inquirer, and the Inter-Academic League (Inter-Ac High School League) Most Valuable Player. He was then named the 2011 Southeastern Pennsylvania Top Junior Pitcher by the Pennsylvania Inquirer.

As a senior in 2012, Koplove was 9–1 with a 2.06 ERA, and 80 strikeouts in 48.0 innings, and batted .347, and was named the 2012 Gatorade/ESPN Pennsylvania Player of the Year, as well as 2012 Rawlings Baseball First Team All-Atlantic Region. He was three-time First-Team All-State and First-Team All Inter-Ac League. His fastball reached 94 miles per hour.

College

Koplove played shortstop and pitched in college for Duke University for the Blue Devils. As a freshman in 2013, he started 45 games at shortstop, and pitched in three games. He played for the Chatham Anglers of the Cape Cod League over the summer, batting .296 and making one relief appearance. As a sophomore in 2014 he started 55 games at shortstop. As a junior in 2015 he was the team's starting shortstop, starting 43 games, and primary closer, pitching 21 times in relief with a 2.13 ERA while striking out 37 batters in 25.1 innings, and setting the school's single-season record with 11 saves.

Minor leagues

Philadelphia Phillies
Koplove was selected in the 17th round of the 2015 Major League Baseball Draft by the Philadelphia Phillies, and signed for a $75,000 signing bonus.

In 2015, he pitched for the Williamsport Crosscutters of the Class A (short-season) New York-Penn League, and in 23 games in relief went 2–3 with a 4.50 ERA. In 2016 Koplove split the season between the Crosscutters, for whom in 16 games in relief he had a 3.76 ERA, and the Lakewood BlueClaws of the Class A South Atlantic League, for whom in 11.2 innings he had a 15.43 ERA.

Miami Marlins
In May 2017 he was released by the Phillies, and the following month he was signed by the Miami Marlins organization. For the season, he played for the Lakewood BlueClaws and the Batavia Muckdogs of the Class A- New York-Penn League, and pitched a combined 3–2 with one save and a 7.84 ERA in 20.2 innings, in which he struck out 26 batters. He had elbow surgery in November 2017, and was released by the Marlins organization on March 31, 2018.

Sussex County Miners
On April 11, 2018, Koplove signed with the Sussex County Miners of the independent Can-Am League. Pitching for them in 2018 he was 7–4 with 2 saves and a 2.61 ERA (3rd in the league) over 31 games, 9 of which were starts, limiting opposing batters to a .201 batting average.  In the playoffs in 2018, he was 2–0 with a save and a  1.68 ERA over 3 games.

Colorado Rockies
In November 2018, the Miners sold Koplove's contract to the Colorado Rockies. He spent the majority of the 2019 season with the Class-A Advanced Lancaster JetHawks, pitching to a 2–1 record with a 3.60 ERA, with 16 strikeouts in 15 innings, as well as one scoreless three-inning appearance in which he struck out five batters with the Class AAA Albuquerque Isotopes of the Pacific Coast League, before he was released on June 7, 2019.

Kansas City T-Bones
On June 19, 2019, Koplove signed with the Kansas City T-Bones of the independent American Association, with whom he was 2–3 with a 6.37 ERA in 29.2 innings over six starts. He was released by the club on December 19, 2019.

Team Israel; World Baseball Classic
Koplove was on the roster of Team Israel at the 2017 World Baseball Classic.

References

External links

1993 births
Living people
Baseball players from Philadelphia
Chatham Anglers players
Duke Blue Devils baseball players
Jewish American baseball players
Kansas City T-Bones players
Lakewood BlueClaws players
Lancaster JetHawks players
Sussex County Miners players
William Penn Charter School alumni
Williamsport Crosscutters players
2017 World Baseball Classic players
21st-century American Jews